Chayapipat Supunpasuch (born 25 February 2001) is a Thai professional footballer who plays as a defensive midfielder for Praiense.

International career
On 26 May 2022, Supunpasuch was called up to the Thailand under-23 for the 2022 AFC U-23 Asian Cup.

Honours

Club
Estoril Praia U23
 Liga Revelação U23: 2020–21

International
Thailand U23
 Southeast Asian Games  Silver medal: 2021

Individual
Estoril B
 3a divisao a.f. lisboa Player of the Year: 2021–22

References

Chayapipat Supunpasuch
Chayapipat Supunpasuch
Chayapipat Supunpasuch
Chayapipat Supunpasuch
Association football defenders
2001 births
Living people
Chayapipat Supunpasuch
Competitors at the 2021 Southeast Asian Games
Chayapipat Supunpasuch